Dehuiyeh or Dehuyeh or Dehueeyeh or Dehooeyeh or Dohuiyeh or Dehooyeh or Dahuiyeh or Dahooeyeh or Dehvieh may refer to:
 Dehuyeh, Estahban, Fars Province
 Dehuiyeh, Khir, Estahban County, Fars Province
 Dehuyeh, Runiz, Estahban County, Fars Province
 Dehuiyeh, Firuzabad, Fars Province
 Dehuyeh, Neyriz, Fars Province
 Dehuiyeh, Kerman
 Dehuiyeh, Derakhtengan, Kerman County, Kerman Province
 Dehuiyeh, Golbaf, Kerman County, Kerman Province
 Dehuiyeh, Rafsanjan, Kerman Province
 Dehuiyeh, Koshkuiyeh, Rafsanjan County, Kerman Province
 Dahuiyeh, Ravar, Kerman Province
 Dehuiyeh, Shahr-e Babak, Kerman Province
 Dahuiyeh, Zarand, Kerman Province